James George Donovan (December 15, 1898 – April 6, 1987) was an American lawyer and politician from New York, serving three terms in the U.S. House of Representatives from 1951 to 1957.

Biography 
Donovan was born on December 15, 1898, in Clinton, Massachusetts. He attended the Massachusetts Institute of Technology from 1916 to 1917. He served in the United States Navy during World War I. He graduated from Harvard University in 1922. He graduated from Columbia Law School in 1924. Active in politics as a Tammany Hall Democrat, he was Undersheriff of New York County from 1934 to 1941.

Political career 
He was a member of the New York State Senate (16th D.) in 1943 and 1944.

Congress 
In an effort to unseat American Labor Party congressman Vito Marcantonio, in 1950, he ran for Congress on both the Democratic and Republican party ballot lines.  He was elected to the 82nd Congress, and won reelection to the 83rd and 84th United States Congresses, holding office from January 3, 1951, to January 3, 1957. In 1956, he ran unsuccessfully for reelection as a Republican after having been denied renomination by Tammany Hall, and was defeated by Alfred E. Santangelo.

Later career and death 
After leaving Congress, in 1957 Donovan was New York State Director of the Federal Housing Administration. He then resumed practicing law, and maintained an office in New York City until retiring in 1965.

He died on April 6, 1987, in New York City.  He was buried at Woodlawn Cemetery in the Bronx.

References

Sources

1898 births
1987 deaths
People from Clinton, Massachusetts
Harvard University alumni
Columbia Law School alumni
Democratic Party New York (state) state senators
Democratic Party members of the United States House of Representatives from New York (state)
Sheriffs of New York County, New York
Burials at Woodlawn Cemetery (Bronx, New York)
20th-century American politicians